Kuzgun-Akhmerovo (Qoźğon-Äxmär) is a rural locality (a village) in Azikeyevsky Selsoviet, Beloretsky District, Bashkortostan, Russia. The population was 275 as of 2010. There are 11 streets.

Geography 
Kuzgun-Akhmerovo is located 15 km northwest of Beloretsk (the district's administrative centre) by road. Chernovka is the nearest rural locality.

References 

Rural localities in Beloretsky District